Donisia Daniel Minja (born 9 August 1999) is a Tanzanian professional footballer who plays as a forward for Yanga Princess and the Tanzania women's national team.

International career
In 2018, Minja scored three goals in the 2018 CECAFA Women's Championship to win the top goal scorer of the competition award.

Honours 

 CECAFA Women's Championship: 2018
 CECAFA Women's Championship Top Scorer : 2018

References

External links 

 

Living people
Tanzanian women's footballers
Women's association football forwards
Tanzania women's international footballers
1999 births